The Finance and Leasing Association (FLA) is the leading trade association for the UK consumer credit, motor finance and asset finance sectors, and the largest organisation of its type in Europe. Members of FLA include: banks, subsidiaries of banks and building societies, the finance arms of retailers and manufacturing companies as well as independent firms. They also represent 75% of "second charge" lenders and in the wake of the growing credit and mortgage problems, have extended their support of so-called responsible lending.

Members provide a range of services including: finance leasing, operating leasing, hire purchase, conditional sale, personal contract purchase plans, personal lease plans, secured and unsecured personal loans.

The FLA campaigns on key industry issues and influences proposals for change. It helps shape the development of government policy and regulation. This involves developing policy areas across the wide range of industry issues, lobbying decision-makers both at home and in Europe.

FLA Board

Rebecca McNeil is currently the Chair of the FLA Board.

References

External links
 Finance and Leasing Association

Financial services companies of the United Kingdom
Leasing companies
Trade associations based in the United Kingdom